The Confederation of Australian Sport (CAS) is the highest national body for sport in Australia. It was established in 1976 to advance the interests of the Australian sports community and to give the industry a united voice in discussions and negotiations with governments and key stakeholders. The organization was founded by 42 individual sporting organizations. By 1985, the organization had 123 affiliates. These organizations represent 5.8 million Australians.

In November 2009, CAS announced that it was stepping back from its role as an advocate and governing body for the Australian sports industry.

References

Bibliography

External links
Confederation of Australian Sport
Australasian Masters Games
Australian Sport Awards

Sports organizations established in 1976

1976 establishments in Australia